Yoo Jun-Soo (born 8 May 1988) is a South Korean footballer who plays for PT Prachuap in the Thai League 1.

Club career
Yoo, a draftee from the 2011 K-League draft intake, was selected by Incheon United for the 2011 season.  His professional debut was as a substitute in Incheon's opening match of the season, replacing the Brazilian import Luizinho in the side's loss to Sangju Sangmu. After regularly featuring in both the K-League and the League Cup, Yoo finally appeared on the score sheet with a goal in Incheon's FA Cup match against Yeonsei University on May 18, helping his team to a 2 - 1 win and ensuring Incheon progressed to the competition's round of 16.

For the 2013 season, Yoo dropped down to the Korea National League and joined Gyeongju KHNP. During the season he scored seven goals. He was signed by Ulsan Hyundai for 2014, returning to the K League 1. He remained with the club until the end of 2017, during which time he was loaned out to the military's Sangju Sangmu FC, which fulfilled his compulsory military service obligations.

In January 2018, Yoo signed for the Thai club Buriram United playing as a defensive midfielder and central defender.

Club career statistics

References

External links

1988 births
Living people
South Korean footballers
Incheon United FC players
Ulsan Hyundai FC players
Gimcheon Sangmu FC players
K League 1 players
Korea National League players
Association football defenders
Association football midfielders